Treaty of Khotyn (Chocim/Hotin), signed in the aftermath of the Battle of Khotyn, ended the Polish–Ottoman War. This peace treaty resulted in no border change but Polish–Lithuanian Commonwealth agreed to stop its interference in Moldavia. Both sides claimed victory, as Commonwealth saw the battle of Khotyn as successfully stopping the Ottoman Empire's invasion of its mainland.

The Treaty was rather favorable to the Commonwealth, but the Ottoman Emperor also gained what it wanted. There were no territorial changes; the Commonwealth-Ottoman border was confirmed to be the Dniester river, and the Commonwealth recognized Ottoman control over Moldavia. In the Commonwealth, and among the Ukrainian Cossacks, stopping of the huge Ottoman army was seen as a great victory.

The treaty for the most part repeated the earlier agreement – Treaty of Busza (also known as Treaty of Jaruga) (1617), negotiated by Stanisław Żółkiewski and Iskender Pasha. That 1617 treaty stated that Poland would not meddle in the internal affairs of Ottoman vassals in Transylvania, Moldavia and Wallachia, the Commonwealth was to prevent Cossacks from raiding lands in the Ottoman Empire, while ceding Khotyn. In return, the Ottoman Empire promised to stop Tatar raids.

The Ottomans, on the other hand, even though they gained Commonwealth recognition of their control over Moldavia, were in much worse shape internally. Notably, Chodkiewicz wasn't the only one to die as a result of that battle: Sultan Osman himself paid the highest price for the failure of his plans.  The Khotyn outcome, and the Ottoman failure to crush the outnumbered Commonwealth army, led Osman to put the blame on the janissaries. Osman wanted to modernize the army, which he blamed for the defeat; his plans for modernization were, however, opposed by the traditional-minded janissaries, culminating in the rebellion of janissaries in 1622, in which Osman II was assassinated.

The Commonwealth-Ottoman border would be fairly quiet until the Ottoman-Commonwealth War (1633-1634).

Khotyn
Khotyn
1621 treaties
Khotyn
1621 in Europe
1621 in the Ottoman Empire
1621 in the Polish–Lithuanian Commonwealth
Bilateral treaties of the Ottoman Empire